Brandon O'Neill (born 12 April 1994) is an Australian professional soccer player who plays as a defensive midfielder for Newcastle Jets in the A-League.

Club career

Perth Glory
Born in Perth, Western Australia, O'Neill signed a youth contract with A-League club Perth Glory in 2010 and then re-signed again in 2011. He made his professional debut in the 2011–12 A-League season on 18 March 2012 in a round 26 clash against Gold Coast United at the Robina Stadium.

On 3 May 2012 it was announced he had signed a two-year senior contract with Perth Glory

Sydney FC
On 25 May 2015, O'Neill signed a two-year contract with Sydney FC.

O'Neill scored his first A-League goal in the Sydney Derby on Saturday 8 October 2016 by bending a free kick around the wall from just outside the penalty area into the top right corner. He scored his second goal of the season, also from a free kick against Melbourne City on Friday 24 February 2017 by curling the ball over the wall and into the top corner.

Following performances which made him a key member of the starting squad, Sydney FC re-signed O'Neill for another two years on 13 December 2016.

On 26 March 2017, O'Neill scored his third goal for Sydney FC away at Perth Glory, with a low and hard shot from outside the box, as the Sky Blues ran out 3–0 winners and secured the premiers plate.

Pohang Stelers
On 13 January 2020, it was announced that K League 1 side Pohang Steelers had reached an agreement with Sydney for the transfer of O'Neill. The fee is believed to be between $250,000 and $300,000 AUD, with the player agreeing to sign a two year deal.

Buriram United
On 3 December 2020, O'Neill signed for Thai League 1 club, Buriram United.

Return to Perth 
On 1 July 2021, it was announced that O'Neill would return to his hometown club on a three-year deal.  Following the departure of Diego Castro, O’Neill was announced on 28 October as captain for the 2021/22 season.

Club statistics

International career
He made his debut for Australia national soccer team on 7 June 2019 in an friendly against South Korea, as a starter.

Honours
Team

Sydney FC
A-League Premiership: 2016–2017, 2017–2018
A-League Championship: 2017, 2019
FFA Cup: 2017

Individual
PFA A-League Team of the Season: 2018-2019

References

External links

1994 births
Soccer players from Perth, Western Australia
Australian soccer players
Australia international soccer players
Perth Glory FC players
Sydney FC players
Pohang Steelers players
A-League Men players
Association football defenders
National Premier Leagues players
Association football midfielders
Living people